Alfred Schwarzmann (22 March 1912 – 11 March 2000) was a German Olympic gymnast. He won three gold and two bronze medals at the 1936 Berlin Olympics and another silver medal at the 1952 Summer Olympics. During World War II, Schwarzmann served in the Wehrmacht and was a recipient of the Knight's Cross of the Iron Cross of Nazi Germany.

Career
Alfred Schwarzmann joined the 13th Company of the Nuremberg Infantry Regiment on 1 April 1935 after signing up for a twelve-year period of service. He was promoted to Unteroffizier on 1 May 1935 and was a member of the Gymnastics team preparing for the 1936 Berlin Olympics, where he won three gold and two bronze medals.

On 10 May 1940 Schwarzmann and his company parachuted into the Netherlands and took a key bridge at Moerdijk. In the first hour of the fighting Schwarzmann was badly wounded when a bullet pierced a lung. He was treated for his wounds in Dordrecht after the Dutch capitulation.

Aged 40, Schwarzmann competed at the 1952 Summer Olympics in all artistic gymnastics events and won a silver medal on the horizontal bar. In 2008 he was inducted into the Germany's Sports Hall of Fame.

Awards
 Iron Cross 2nd Class & 1st Class (25 May 1940)
 Wound Badge (1939) in Black (29 May 1940)
 Knight's Cross of the Iron Cross on 29 May 1940 as Oberleutnant and platoon leader in the 8./Fallschirmjäger-Regiment 1
 Wehrmacht Long Service Award 4th Class
 Heer (army) Parachutist Badge

References

Bibliography

External links
 Alfred Schwarzmann
 Alfred Schwarzmann @ the Hall of Fame des deutschen Sports

1912 births
2000 deaths
Sportspeople from Fürth
People from the Kingdom of Bavaria
German male artistic gymnasts
Olympic gymnasts of Germany
Olympic gold medalists for Germany
Olympic silver medalists for Germany
Olympic bronze medalists for Germany
Olympic medalists in gymnastics
Medalists at the 1936 Summer Olympics
Medalists at the 1952 Summer Olympics
Gymnasts at the 1936 Summer Olympics
Gymnasts at the 1952 Summer Olympics
Fallschirmjäger of World War II
German prisoners of war in World War II held by the United Kingdom
Recipients of the Knight's Cross of the Iron Cross
German Army soldiers of World War II
20th-century German people
Military personnel from Bavaria